Dalhousie was an electoral district of the Legislative Assembly in the Australian state of Victoria from 1859 to 1927. It was based in north-western Victoria. The district had been named Electoral district of Anglesey. The district of Dalhousie was defined in the 1858 Electoral Act as :

Members for Dalhousie
 Snodgrass was member for Anglesey 1856 to 1859

Anglesey existed in a second incarnation from 1889 to 1904.

      # = by-election

The new Electoral district of Bulla and Dalhousie was created in 1927 when Dalhousie was abolished. Pollard was member for Bulla and Dalhousie 1927–1932.

Election results

References

Former electoral districts of Victoria (Australia)
1859 establishments in Australia
1889 disestablishments in Australia
1904 establishments in Australia
1927 disestablishments in Australia